Bajčetina is a village situated in Knić municipality in Šumadija, Serbia. It is the birthplace of the former President of Serbia, Tomislav Nikolić.

References

Populated places in Šumadija District